The 2010–11 Estudiantes Tecos season was the 64th professional season of Mexico's top-flight football league. The season is split into two tournaments—the Torneo Apertura and the Torneo Clausura—each with identical formats and each contested by the same eighteen teams. Estudiantes Tecos began their season on July 24, 2010 against Cruz Azul, Estudiantes Tecos will play their homes games on Fridays at 8pm local time.

Torneo Apertura

Squad
Current squad as of November 16, 2009

Out on loan

Apertura 2010 results

Regular season

Transfers

In

Out

Goalscorers

Results

Results summary

Results by round

Torneo Clausura

Squad
Current squad as of January 7, 2011

Out on loan

Clausura 2011 results

Regular season

Goalscorers

Results

Results summary

Results by round

References

2010–11 Primera División de México season
Mexican football clubs 2010–11 season